Dragon Mountain is a steel roller coaster located at Marineland of Canada near Niagara Falls, Ontario. Built by Arrow Huss, it opened to the public on July 16, 1983.

It is also the only roller coaster with a bowtie element.

Upon the opening in the early 80's, the ride was missing the proposed volcano facade around the helix, and the miniature waterfalls built around the stretch of track after exiting the first tunnel. These unthemed parts of the ride had nothing but the framework, which was constructed along with the track. In 2006, Marineland decided to complete the volcano to improve the ride's appearance. Whether the park would like to add more to the facade to make it look more like a volcano is unknown. This has been the only improvement to the ride's theming, as the other incomplete section has remained untouched.

Ride Experience 

The riders are first welcomed at the base of the mountain by a long path. At the end of the path lies the dragon's cave, which is carved to look like an actual dragon's head. The queue and station inside are almost in complete darkness. The station, however, is lit up more than the queue, because it would make operating the ride extremely difficult for the ride operators and attendants. Upon exiting the station, the riders are brought back outside climbing up the lush-green hill. Throughout most of the ride, the track follows the terrain closely.

References

External links
www.marinelandcanada.com

Roller coasters in Ontario
Roller coasters introduced in 1983
1983 establishments in Ontario